Canfield Township is one of the fourteen townships of Mahoning County, Ohio, United States.  The 2010 census found 16,164 people in the township, 8,649 of whom lived in the unincorporated portions of the township.

Geography
Located in the center of the county, it borders the following townships:
Austintown Township - north
Youngstown - northeast corner
Boardman Township - east
Beaver Township - southeast
Green Township - southwest
Ellsworth Township - west
Jackson Township - northwest corner

The city of Canfield is located in the central part of Canfield Township.

Name and history
Canfield Township is named for Judson Canfield, a pioneer settler and prominent land owner.

It is the only Canfield Township statewide.

Government
The township is governed by a three-member board of trustees, who are elected in November of odd-numbered years to a four-year term beginning on the following January 1. Two are elected in the year after the presidential election and one is elected in the year before it. There is also an elected township fiscal officer, who serves a four-year term beginning on April 1 of the year after the election, which is held in November of the year before the presidential election. Vacancies in the fiscal officership or on the board of trustees are filled by the remaining trustees.

References

External links
County website

Townships in Mahoning County, Ohio
Townships in Ohio